Musaviyeh (also Romanized as Mūsavīyeh) is a village in Afriz Rural District, Sedeh District, Qaen County, South Khorasan Province, Iran. At the 2017 census, its population was 1,448, in 448 families.

References 

Populated places in Qaen County